Lake Manuherikia was a prehistoric lake which once stretched over some  in what is now inland Otago in New Zealand's South Island. It stretched from Bannockburn and the Nevis valley in the west to Naseby in the east, and from the Waitaki valley in the north to Ranfurly in the south, including much of the area now referred to as the Maniototo. The lake existed from around 19 to 16 million years ago during the Miocene epoch, at which point New Zealand was significantly warmer than the present. 

The warmer climate of Miocene New Zealand resulted in the lake being surrounded by rich subtropical vegetation. The edges of the lake were fringed with fen and bogland. After the lake dried up, its bed became a fossil-rich layer of sandstone, now known as the Manuherikia Group.

See also
Foulden Maar
Manuherikia Group
Saint Bathans fauna

References

Former lakes of Oceania
Lakes of Otago
Geology of New Zealand
Central Otago District
Neogene paleogeography
Miocene Oceania
Paleontological sites of New Zealand